The Blue Man (also known as Eternal Evil) is a 1985 Canadian horror film directed by George Mihalka and starring Winston Rekert, Karen Black, John Novak, and Patty Talbot.

Premise
A dissatisfied Montreal director of TV commercials is taught to astrally project himself by a mysterious woman. But soon he finds that he does it against his will when he sleeps, and while he does it, he commits savage acts against those in his life.

Cast
 Winston Rekert as Paul Sharpe
 Karen Black as Janus
 John Novak as Kauffman
 Patty Talbot as Jennifer Sharpe
 Vlasta Vrána as Scott
 Andrew Bednarski as Matthew Sharpe
 Bronwen Booth as Isis
 Tom Rack as Dr. Meister
 Joanne Côté as Helen
 Philip Spensley as Bill Pearson
 Ron Lea as Mick
 Len Watt as Dr. Morton
 Michael Sinelnikoff as William Duval
 Lois Maxwell as Monica Duval
 Anthony Sherwood as Jensen
 Walter Massey as John Westmore

Release
The Blue Man had a limited release during the 1986 holiday season. The film won the Prix du public at the Avoriaz horror film festival in January 1987 and was nominated for two Genie Awards: Winston Rekert for Best Actor and Marvin Dolgay for Best Score.

The film received a retrospective screening at the 2017 Fantasia Film Festival.

References

External links

1985 films
Canadian supernatural horror films
1985 thriller films
Supernatural thriller films
1980s English-language films
Films directed by George Mihalka
English-language Canadian films
Films set in Montreal
Astral projection in popular culture
1980s Canadian films